Louis Joseph Mangan (26 May 1922 – 27 May 2015) was an Australian rules footballer who played with South Melbourne in the Victorian Football League (VFL).

Mangan also served in the Royal Australian Air Force during World War II.

Notes

External links 

2015 deaths
1922 births
Australian rules footballers from Melbourne
Sydney Swans players
Military personnel from Melbourne
People from Ascot Vale, Victoria
Royal Australian Air Force personnel of World War II